Woobens Pacius (born May 11, 2001) is a Canadian soccer player who plays for Forge FC in the Canadian Premier League.

Early life
Pacius is a native of Terrebonne, Quebec. He joined the Montreal Impact Academy (later known as CF Montreal Academy) in 2017. From 2018 to 2019, a series of knee injuries sidelined him for a year and a half. He was invited to the pre-season camp for the first team ahead of the 2021 season. After attending the pre-season, he was not offered a first team contract, giving him the option of either joining the CF Montreal U23 team or leaving the club.

Club career
On August 8, 2021, Pacius signed with Canadian Premier League club Forge FC. He made his debut the same day, coming on as a substitute against Atlético Ottawa. On August 25, he scored his first and second professional goals against Atlético Ottawa in a 4–0 victory. During his debut season, Pacius won multiple man of the match awards. Forge advanced to the CPL final, but were defeated by Pacific FC. Remaining with Forge in 2022, he continued his goal-scoring prowess, with a streak of seven goals in six games, including a hat trick on July 19 against FC Edmonton and being named CPL Player of the Month for July. On August 6, 2022, he scored the fastest goal in Forge's history with a second minute goal against HFX Wanderers FC. He led Forge in scoring with ten regular season goals in 2022, finishing fourth in the overall league scoring race. He scored in both legs of the playoff semi-finals against Cavalry FC, helping Forge reach the championship match, where they won the championship. At the end of the 2022 season, he was nominated for the CPL U21 Player of the Year award and Forge picked up his club option for the 2023 season.

International career
Born in Canada, Pacius is of Haitian descent. In 2016, he was invited to an identification camp for the Canadian U15 team.

Career statistics

References

External links

Woobens Pacius Player Analysis at The Mastermind Site

2001 births
Living people
Association football forwards
Canadian soccer players
Soccer people from Quebec
People from Terrebonne, Quebec
Canadian sportspeople of Haitian descent
Forge FC players
Canadian Premier League players
FC L'Assomption players